Philip Benjamin Heymann (October 30, 1932 – November 30, 2021) was an American legal scholar and federal prosecutor who headed the Criminal Division of the Justice Department as Assistant Attorney General during the Carter administration and was briefly Deputy Attorney General in the Clinton administration before he resigned over management and policy differences as well as perceived interference by the White House. He was involved internationally in supporting the rule of law in criminal justice systems. In domestic politics he was a vocal supporter of civil and political liberties and, as such, was actively critical of the George W. Bush administration, particularly its warrantless domestic spying program. Even before the September 11 attacks, Heymann studied and published on how prosecution of antiterror policies can be done consistent with the rule of law in a democratic society. He was later James Bar Ames Professor of Law, Emeritus at Harvard Law School, where he began teaching in 1969.

Early life and education
Heymann was born in the Squirrel Hill section of Pittsburgh on October 30, 1932, as one of two children of Sidney B. and Bessie (Kann) Heymann. His father owned an insurance agency. He was a 1950 graduate of Pittsburgh's Shady Side Academy. Heymann's sister, Sidney (known as Sally) became a licensed psychologist in Washington, Pennsylvania. She died in 1991.

In 1954 he received his B.A. degree summa cum laude from Yale University, where he was a member of Scroll and Key Society. He was awarded a Fulbright grant, and he studied at the Sorbonne in Paris for the 1954–1955 academic year.  He then served two years in the Air Force's Office of Special Investigations, reviewing security clearances. He later received his J.D. degree from Harvard Law School, where he was third in his class and one of two case editors of the Harvard Law Review. Thereafter, he clerked for Justice John M. Harlan during the 1960-1961 term.

Career

Early government career

Solicitor General's Office
From 1961 to 1965 Heymann practiced in the office of the Solicitor General of the United States under Archibald Cox. After his admission to the Supreme Court bar in 1963, Heymann argued six cases before the Supreme Court. Only one of these, however, received any publicity, and that was owing to the unusual levity of the court on that occasion. Heymann left the Solicitor General's office shortly after President Johnson accepted Cox's pro forma resignation at the end of the court's term in 1965.

State Department
In September 1965 he became deputy in the Bureau of Security and Consular Affairs of the State Department and was appointed acting administrator in March 1966. Right before his appointment he issued a reprimand to the head of the Passport Office for asking the U.S. embassies in Paris and Moscow to report on the activities of Harvard history professor and anti-nuclear activist H. Stuart Hughes. The written reprimand cited the significant freedom that Americans ought to enjoy in freedom of movement. After issuing the reprimand, the Bureau learned that the FBI had asked for the instructions and that such surveillance requests had routinely been made without the knowledge of the directors of the Bureau for at least two decades. The affair became something of a political issue, an early pushback against government surveillance. After serving as acting administrator of the Bureau for nearly a year, Heymann was appointed Deputy Assistant Secretary in the State Department's Bureau of Internal Organizations. In 1967 he became Executive Assistant to Under Secretary of State Nicholas Katzenbach. In 1968 Heymann helped Katzenbach force a reluctant State Department bureaucracy to finally undertake a review of the denial of security clearance of John Paton Davies, one of the China Hands whose security clearance was revoked 14 years before by then Secretary of State John Foster Dulles, who made the decision under pressure of Joseph McCarthy's allegations. The conduct of Davies was vindicated in the later review and his security clearance re-instated.

Harvard, Cox and Watergate
Heymann left the State Department for Harvard Law School where he taught as visiting professor from July 1969. He was one of the very few faculty hires by the law school who had a substantial amount of non-academic experience between graduation and appointment. Heymann also became a faculty member at Harvard Kennedy School.

Heymann believed that law students were better served by being taught how to build institutions rather than merely instructed in legal ideas. At the beginning of his academic career Heymann worked to introduce law students to some of the methods taught in the Kennedy School for creating and managing institutions. In 1979 he proposed and the Law School tentatively approved a proposal for a 13-hour elective in such fields as analytical methods, economic theory, statistical methods and political theory.

At Harvard he was now a colleague of Archibald Cox, his boss in the Solicitor General's office. Their political impulses were roughly the same. Heymann joined Cox and most of the Law School faculty, for instance, in an open letter to Congress, urging an end to the Vietnam war at the height of student unrest following the Kent State shootings.  Cox, unlike Heymann, however, refused to involve himself in the politics of the Supreme Court. Heymann collaborated with Cox in drafting the amicus curiae brief to the Massachusetts Supreme Judicial Court on behalf of the American Mutual Assurance Alliance and the American Insurance Association, in support of the constitutionality of Massachusetts's No-fault insurance scheme, a piece of legislation with a decided Harvard connection.

In May 1973 when Cox was confirmed as the Special Counsel to investigate and prosecute crimes connected with the Watergate scandal. Cox chose two fellow faculty members to help him set up the office. One was James Vorenberg, who had been the executive director of President Johnson's Commission on Law Enforcement and Administration of Justice from 1965 to 1967 and had founded and chaired the Center for the Advancement of Criminal Justice at Harvard Law School. He was therefore versed in how to create, staff and run a large legal institution dealing with complex problems. The other was Heymann. Journalist James Doyle who saw the daily workings of the special counsel's office as communications adviser to Cox and Leon Jaworski concluded that because Cox's own son broke the family tradition by not entering the legal profession and because Heymann worked for Cox at the Solicitor General's Office and trained under him at Harvard Law School, Heymann, his Harvard colleague, "was as close to Archibald Cox as a son".

The first task of the three lawyers was to prevent the resignation of the three assistant United States Attorneys who had prosecuted the Watergate burglars, who had threatened to quit in a pique because Cox had not consulted with them before appearing before the Senate Judiciary Committee to explain how he planned to proceed. Cox met with them for two and a half hours, and while he gave them a tepid letter of support. he privately determined that he needed to hire a criminal trial lawyer to replace them. Cox hired James F. Neal, who he knew from his days as Solicitor General, when Neal won a conviction of James Hoffa for jury tampering. It was Neal and Heymann who debriefed the three prosecutors. The next major challenge was to ensure that whoever was indicted would receive a fair trial and prevent premature disclosure of evidence that might compromise the criminal cases. In that regard the Senate Watergate Committee proved a challenge because they were about to televise a hearing with Nixon counsel John Dean. Cox met with the Committee's counsel, Sam Dash, who refused to postpone or otherwise modify any of the committee's plans. Cox was afraid that the nationwide publicity might jeopardize the case and that the committee's use of immunity to compel Dean's testimony might altogether bar charges against Dean. Cox decided to obtain a court order either postponing or otherwise modifying the terms of the hearing and preventing the Committee from obtaining immunity for Dean. After the staff lawyers researched the issue, they concluded that there was no basis for such a motion. Heymann was also against it for policy reasons. He thought that Cox should not be perceived as "the one [who] kept the country from getting the story". Since Cox had publicly committed to such a motion, however, he decided to have Heymann argue the motion in court to prevent damage to his own relations with the court. In a court room packed with reporters Heymann gingerly made the argument, mainly to show that the Special Counsel was concerned with the due process rights of the defendants and not to prevent the public from hearing the evidence. (Cox had expressly cautioned him not to "overargue" the motion.) At one point Heymann said, "I want to be careful not to overargue my case ..." Judge John Sirica tersely replied: "No chance of that, young man." The court denied the Special Counsel's motion in all respects.

Heymann spent the rest of the summer working as Associate Special Counsel, returning to Cambridge to teach in the fall. When President Richard Nixon fired Cox that October in the so-called Saturday Night Massacre Heymann flew to Washington to lend Cox moral support during Cox's press conference at the National Press Club.  He was deeply pessimistic that Nixon would allow the prosecutors to continue. He would nevertheless return for the summers of 1974 and 1975 to work in the office of Cox's successor, Leon Jaworksi.

Later career

Heymann compiled the National Football League report on the sexual harassment of female sportswriter Lisa Olson.

He was Assistant Attorney General (Criminal Division) from 1978 to 1981 and Deputy Attorney General from 1993 to 1994.

Heymann was co-chairman of the Constitution Project's bipartisan Sentencing Committee.

He was elected to the Common Cause National Governing Board in 1978 and 1998.

Personal life
In 1954, Heymann married the former Ann Ross of the Oakland section of Pittsburgh, and they had two children. His son, Stephen Heymann, is a former Assistant United States Attorney. His daughter Jody, with whom he wrote an article in 1996 while she was assistant professor of health care policy at Harvard Medical School and the John F. Kennedy School of Government at Harvard, subsequently became Dean of the Field School of Public Health at the University of California, Los Angeles.

Heymann died from complications of a stroke at his home in Los Angeles on November 30, 2021, at the age of 89.

Selected publications

Books
 Heymann, Phlip B. and William H. Kenety (comp.), The Murder Trial of Wilbur Jackson: A Homicide in the Family (St. Paul, Minn.: West Publishing Co., 1975).
 Heymann, Philip B., The Politics of Public Management (New Haven, Conn.: Yale University Press, c1987).
 Mathews, M.L., Philip B. Heymann and A.S. Mathews (eds.), Policing the Conflict in South Africa (Gainesville, Florida: University Press of Florida, 1993). 
 Heymann, Philip B., Terrorism and America: A Commonsense Strategy for a Democratic Society (Cambridge, Massachusetts: MIT Press, 1998).
 Heymann, Philip B. and William N. Brownsberger, Drug Addiction and Drug Policy: The Struggle to Control Dependence (Cambridge, Massachusetts: Harvard University Press, 2001).
 Heymann, Philip B., Terrorism, Freedom, and Security: Winning Without War (Cambridge, Massachusetts: MIT Press, 2003).
 Heymann, Philip B. and Juliette N. Kayyem, Long-Term Legal Strategy Project for Preserving Security and Democratic Freedoms in the War on Terrorism ([Cambridge, Massachusetts:] National Memorial Institute for the Prevention of Terrorism, [2004]).
 Heymann, Philip B. and Juliette N. Kayyem, Protecting Liberty in an Age of Terror (Cambridge, Massachusetts: MIT Press, 2005).
 Heymann, Philip B., Living the Policy Process (Oxford: Oxford University Press, 2008).
 Blum, Gabriella and Philip B. Heymann, Laws, Outlaws,  and Terrorists: Lessons from the War on Terrorism (Cambridge, Massachusetts: MIT Press, 2010).

Articles
 Heymann, Philip B., "Understanding Criminal Investigations", 22 Harvard Journal on Legislation 315-34 (Summer 1985).
 Heymann, Philip B. and Sara Holtz, "The Severely Defective Newborn: The Dilemma and the Decision Process", 23 Public Policy 381-417 (Fall 1975).
 Heymann, Philip B., "A Law Enforcement Model for Legal Services", 23 Clearinghouse Review 254-57 (July 1989).
 Heymann, Philip B., "International Cooperation in Dealing With Terrorism: A Review of Law and Recent Practice", 6 American University Journal of International Law and Policy 1-34 (Fall 1990).
 Heymann, Philip B., "Two Models of National Attitudes toward International Cooperation in Law Enforcement", 31 Harvard International Law Journal 99-107 (Winter 1990).
 Heymann, Philip B., "Considering the Costs and Benefits of Lawyering in Drafting Legislation or Establishing Precedents, 36 Villanova Law Review 191-216 (February 1991).
 Getmann, Philip B., "Should Latin American Prosecutors Be Independent of the Executive in Prosecuting Government Abuses?" 26 University of Miami Inter-American Law Review 535-59 (April 1995).
 Heymann, Philip B and Mark H. Moore, "The Federal Role in Dealing with Violent Street Crime: Principles, Questions, and Cautions", 543 Annals of the American Academy of Political and Social Science 103-15 (January 1996).
 Heymann, Philip and Jody Heymann, "The Fate of Public Debate in the United States", 33 Harvard Journal on Legislation 511-26  (Spring 1996).
 Heymann, Philip B., "Democracy and Corruption", 20 Fordham International Law Journal 323-46 (December 1996).
 Heymann, Philip B., "The New Policing", 28 Fordham Urban Law Journal 407-56 (December 2000).
 Heymann, Philip B., "Cautionary Note on the Expanding Role of the U.S. Attorneys' Office", 28 Capital University Law Review 745-52 (2000).
 Heymann, Philip B., "Civil Liberties and Human Rights in the Aftermath of September 11", 29 Human Rights 17-25 (Winter 2002).
 Heymann, Philip, "The On/Off Switch", 16 William and Mary Bill of Rights Journal 55-62 (October 2007).
 Blum, Gabriella and Philip B. Heymann, "Law and Policy of Targeted Killing", 1 Harvard National Security Journal 145-70 (June 27, 2010).

See also 
 List of law clerks of the Supreme Court of the United States (Seat 9)

Notes

References

External links

1932 births
2021 deaths
20th-century American lawyers
21st-century American lawyers
California Democrats
Clinton administration personnel
Harvard Law School alumni
Harvard Law School faculty
Law clerks of the Supreme Court of the United States
Lawyers from Pittsburgh
United States Assistant Attorneys General for the Criminal Division
United States Deputy Attorneys General
Yale College alumni
Fulbright alumni